Isaura Nea, in Latin Isaura Nova, both meaning 'New Isaura', was a town of the Roman and Byzantine era, so called in juxtaposition with the settlement of Isaura Palaea. It also bore the name Leontopolis, and in later days was included in the province of Lycaonia.

Along with Isaura Palaea, the city was one of the two major settlements of the region of Isauria (Ἰσαυρία), now southern Turkey, and is identified with Aydoğmuş, formerly Dorla, Bozkır, Konya Province.

History
Isaura Nea was the successor settlement to Isaura Palaea ('Old Isaura'), which had been destroyed by the Roman Servilius Isauricus, and ceded by Rome to Amyntas of Galatia, who built out of the ruins of Isaura Palaea a new city in the neighbourhood, which he surrounded with a wall; but he did not live to complete the work. In the 3rd century, Isaura Nea was the residence of the rival emperor Trebellianus; but in the time of Ammianus Marcellinus nearly all traces of its former magnificence had vanished.

Bishopric of Leontopolis
The city was the seat of  an ancient bishopric and is mentioned in all the Notitiae Episcopatuum of the Byzantine era.  In the mid Byzantine period  the city bishopric was merged with  the older neighbouring bishopric of Isauropolis.

The Isaurian church was originally under the authority of the Patriarch of Antioch, but was attached to the Patriarch of Constantinople in the late 7th or early 8th century.

Epitaphs have been found of three bishops, Theophilus, Sisamoas, and Mamas, who lived between the years 250 and 400. Three other bishops are also known, Hilarius, 381; Callistratus, somewhat later; Aetius, 451. The last named bishop also bears the title of Isauropolis, the name of a city which also figures in the Hierocles's Synecdemus. As no Notitiae Episcopatuum make mention of Isauropolis, Ramsay supposes that the Diocese of Isauropolis was early joined with that of Isaura Palaea which is mentioned in all the Notitiae.

The bishopric remains a titular see of the Roman Catholic church.

References

Populated places in ancient Isauria
Populated places in ancient Lycaonia
Ancient Greek archaeological sites in Turkey
Roman towns and cities in Turkey
Former populated places in Turkey
Populated places of the Byzantine Empire
History of Konya Province
Catholic titular sees in Asia